Robert William Miller (August 1, 1908 — June 12, 1986) was a Canadian ice hockey centre and defenceman who played 95 games in the National Hockey League.

Career 
Between 1934 and 1937, Miller played for the Montreal Maroons and Montreal Canadiens. The rest of his career, which lasted from 1926 to 1937, was spent in senior leagues. He won the Stanley Cup with the Maroons in 1935.

Career statistics

Regular season and playoffs

External links
 

1908 births
1986 deaths
Canadian ice hockey defencemen
Ice hockey people from New Brunswick
Montreal Canadiens players
Montreal Maroons players
New Haven Eagles players
People from Campbellton, New Brunswick
Stanley Cup champions